Doin' My Thing is the second studio album by American country music artist Luke Bryan. It was released on October 6, 2009, by Capitol Records Nashville. The album includes the singles "Do I," which peaked at number 2 on the U.S. Billboard Hot Country Songs chart, "Rain Is a Good Thing", Bryan's first number one hit on the Billboard Hot Country Songs chart, and "Someone Else Calling You Baby." Also included is a cover version of OneRepublic's "Apologize." The album has sold over a million copies in the United States by February 2016. This was Luke's first album to have a crossover-friendly country-pop sound, which was a departure from the neotraditional country sound of his first album.

Content
"Do I" is the first single from the album. Bryan co-wrote this song with Charles Kelley and Dave Haywood of the group Lady Antebellum, whose lead singer Hillary Scott (along with Kelley and Haywood) also sings background vocals on it (but is not officially credited as a featured artist). Also included is a cover version of OneRepublic's "Apologize." Regarding the album's sound, Bryan told CMT, "We wanted to make a bigger-sounding record, something that moved a little down the road from the first record. We wanted to show my growth vocally and lyrically."

Critical reception
Country Weekly critic Chris Neal gave the album three-and-a-half stars out of five, saying that it showed a country music influence in the lyrics. Neal also said that "Do I" showed "a knack for convincingly delivering hymns to thwarted love," and said that while the "Apologize" cover was "well-sung," it was not "meant to be country." Stephen Thomas Erlewine of AllMusic also gave it three-and-a-half stars, saying that it was more relaxed than I'll Stay Me. Matt Bjorke described the album favorably in his review for Roughstock, where he wrote that "Bryan doesn't have to worry about a sophomore slump as he seems to have gotten better both musically and vocally on album number two." Michael Sudhalter of Country Standard Time gave a generally positive review, saying that Bryan's songwriting seemed stronger than on the first album.

Track listing

Personnel
Mike Brignardello – bass guitar
Luke Bryan – lead vocals
Joe Chemay – bass guitar
J.T. Corenflos – electric guitar
Paul Franklin – pedal steel guitar
Kenny Greenberg – electric guitar
Rob Hajacos – fiddle
Tony Harrell – organ, piano
Kirk "Jelly Roll" Johnson – harmonica
Mike Johnson – pedal steel guitar
Paul Leim – drums, percussion
B. James Lowry – acoustic guitar
Greg Morrow – drums, percussion
Mike Rojas – organ, piano
Hillary Scott – background vocals on "Do I"
Joe Spivey – fiddle, mandolin
Russell Terrell – background vocals
John Willis – banjo, acoustic guitar

Charts and certifications

Weekly charts

Certifications

Year-end charts

Singles

References

2009 albums 
Capitol Records Nashville albums
Luke Bryan albums